Robert Nunn (1808 – 2 May 1853), better known as Bobby Nunn, was an English concert-hall songwriter and performer in the 19th century. His most famous song is possibly "The Fiery Clock Fyece". A roof slater by trade, after suffering a serious injury that cost him his vision, he was unable to continue employment, taking up music to support his wife and three children.

Life 
Nunn was born in Newcastle. He was a roof slater by trade, but a tragic accident occurred, a fall from the roof of a house after being struck by lightning, causing him to lose his vision and two of his fingers.

After the accident he was unable to continue his trade and turned to his talents as a musician. Fortunately, as a young man, he had played both the triangle and the fiddle in his school orchestra, allowing him to earn his living as an accomplished fiddle player to support his family – a wife, a daughter and two sons. He lived as an entertainer, singing his own songs in the evenings in clubs and small bars.

He was not afraid of hard work; during the day he assisted Jacob Sopwith of Sopwith & Co, Ltd., a manufacturer of cabinets. He loved music, but had a passion for birds; as a hobby he would build cages for them.

Nunn was a regular at pubs, clubs, and similar venues on Tyneside and the adjoining areas. He was heavily built, and a great favourite at parties and entertainment nights at the clubs, pubs and halls. At the high point of his career, it was said that “no party of the kind was considered complete without ‘Bobby’ and his fiddle." Despite his blindness and lack of fingers, his home life seemed to be happy, and he even wrote one of his songs, “Roby’s Wife’s Lamentation”, about it.

He was a skillful performer, famed for his playing-up to women.  He was not, however, considered to be highly educated or intellectual. Suffering the effects of a few drinks, some of his songs then contained much innuendo and were rather coarse, which seemed to please his audiences of both women and men. He composed songs to perform, and would sing songs written by others, as well. One of his fellow songwriters, Robert Emery, wrote of him in his song, "The Sandgate Lassie's Lament". Alexander Hay was involved in the location of a manuscript (described as mutilated) of one of his songs.

Nunn died on 2 May 1853 aged 45, at Queen Street, Castle Garth, Newcastle, and was described as "A Newcastle man who had the Burr in all its delightful purity".  As stated in his will, he was buried at sea.

Works 
His songs were first published by Fordyce in 1842, and later in "Songs of the Tyne; being a collection of popular local songs. No.1", which was published by J. Ross of Royal Arcade, Newcastle upon Tyne, c 1846

His songs include:

 "Blind Willie’s Deeth" – appeared in the booklet “Songs of the Tyne Vol 1”, published c1846 and gives reflections on the death of the well-known character William "Blind Willie" Purvis
 "Drucken Bella Roy, O!" – to the tune of "Duncan M'Callaghan" – tells of Bella Roy, a well-known street-vendor of fruit, fish, etc. a once-attractive young woman, but later pitied due to "the drink”
 "Fiery Clock Fyece (The)" (or "The Bonny Clock Fyece") – to the tune of "Coal Hole". The dial of the clock on what would become Newcastle Cathedral, was first illuminated with gas on 5 December 1829. This comic song tells of a pitman, having been drinking, seeing it for the first time and thinking it was afire.
 "Jocker"
 "Keelman's Reasons For Attending Church (The)" – to the tune of "Jemmy Joneson's Whurry", first published c1846, tells of his pondering over the sermon before going back to drinking
 "Luckey's Dream" – to the tune of "Caller Fair"
 "Newcastle Lad (The)" – (or "Newcastle is my Native Place")
 "Pitman and the Blackin' (The)" – possibly his first song – to the tune of "Cole Hole"
 "Poor Aud Horse (The)" – this song appears to have been lost.
 "Quarter of Currans (The)" – this song appears to have been lost.
 "Roby's Wife's Lamentation"
 "St. Nicholas' Church"
 "Sandgate Lass on the Ropery Banks (The)" – to the tune of "The Skipper's Wedding", first published c1846, tells of a lass courting her keelman.
 "Sandgate Wife's Nurse Song"
 "Workmen's trip (A)"?? – A song about R & W Hawthorn Workmen's trip to Edinburgh, 1847

See also 
 Geordie dialect words
 Benjamin Ward Richardson

References

External links
  FARNE – Folk Archive Resource North East
 Wor Geordie songwriters
 Allan’s Illustrated Edition of Tyneside songs and readings

English singers
English songwriters
People from Newcastle upon Tyne (district)
Musicians from Tyne and Wear
1853 deaths
1808 births
Geordie songwriters
19th-century English singers